Eurymela is a genus of leafhoppers.  There are seven known species, and they are found throughout mainland Australia.  The two most common species are E. fenestrata and E. distincta. E. fenestrata is the type species. Species of the genus are commonly known as "Jassids".  They feed on the sap of Eucalypts.

References

External links
 Eurymela from the Atlas of Living Australia

Cicadellidae genera
Insects of Australia
Eurymelinae
Taxa named by Amédée Louis Michel le Peletier
Taxa named by Jean Guillaume Audinet-Serville